The University of North Dakota School of Law is located in Grand Forks, North Dakota at the University of North Dakota (UND) and is the only law school in North Dakota. It was established in 1899. The law school is home to approximately 240 students and has more than 3,000 alumni. It has one of the smallest student populations among the American Bar Association accredited law schools.

The institution offers the J.D. degree and a joint degree programs in law and public administration (J.D./M.P.A.) and also business administration (J.D./M.B.A.). It also offers certificates in Indian law and aviation law. The school is also home to the Northern Plains Indian Law Center. According to North Dakota's official 2016 ABA-required disclosures, 51.3% of the Class of 2016 obtained full-time, long-term, JD-required employment nine months after graduation.

History
The UND School of Law was founded in 1899. The first dean of the law school was Guy C. H. Corliss, who served as the first Chief Justice of the North Dakota Supreme Court.

Admissions
In 2018, the median GPA for incoming UND Law students was 3.13, while the median LSAT score was 148. In 2018, the School of Law received 275 applications for its J.D. program, of which 176 were accepted and 62 were enrolled. In recent years, the school has increased its student diversity through partial tuition waivers for members of minority groups as well as transfers from Charlotte  and Arizona Summit School of Law. In addition, the school attracts a number of international students from Canada, Norway and other countries.

Ranking
In its 2015 ranking of American law schools, U.S. News & World Report ranked UND Law 144 out of approximately 194 accredited law schools.

Curriculum
UND Law has a formal Curricular Mission Statement to guide changes to its educational program.  In 2013–14, the school reconfigured the required first-year curriculum, adding a new Professional Foundations course.

Building
In 2013, the North Dakota legislature approved $11.4 million for a major addition and renovation to the existing building.  Construction started in Summer 2014 and was completed in Fall 2015, with the dedication and ribbon-cutting taking place on October 9.

Thormodsgard Law Library

The three-story Thormodsgard Law Library adjacent to the School of Law building at UND is named in honor of Olaf H. Thormodsgard, who was Dean of the University of North Dakota School of Law from 1933 to 1962.

The library underwent a renovation in 2003 that added mobile compact shelving.  The upgrade increased the shelf-space for the library's growing collection of legal materials (which includes a core collection of 312,000 volumes).  Following a 15-month renovation a new wing opened.

Employment 
According to North Dakota's official 2016 ABA-required disclosures, 51.3% of the Class of 2016 obtained full-time, long-term, JD-required employment nine months after graduation. North Dakota's Law School Transparency under-employment score is 31.6%, indicating the percentage of the Class of 2016 unemployed, pursuing an additional degree, or working in a non-professional, short-term, or part-time job nine months after graduation.

Costs
The total cost of attendance (indicating the cost of tuition, fees, and living expenses) at North Dakota for the 2015–2016 academic year is $27,987 for residents and $41,976 for nonresidents. The Law School Transparency estimated debt-financed cost of attendance for three years (2013) is $113,029 for residents and $163,484 for nonresidents.

Notable alumni
Kelly Armstrong -  (J.D. 2003), U.S. Congressman (R-ND) (2019–present)
Earl Pomeroy -  (J.D. 1979), U.S. Congressman (D-ND) (1993–2011) 
Olger B. Burtness - (LL.B 1907), U.S. Congressman (R-ND) (1921–1933), North Dakota District Judge (1950-1960) 
Kermit Edward Bye - (J.D. 1962), Circuit Judge, United States Court of Appeals for the Eighth Circuit (2000–2016) 
Ralph R. Erickson - (J.D. 1984), North Dakota District Judge (1994–2003), Chief United States District Judge for the District of North Dakota (2003–2017), Circuit Judge, United States Court of Appeals for the Eighth Circuit 
Daniel L. Hovland - (J.D. 1979), United States District Judge for the District of North Dakota (2003–present) 
Rodney S. Webb - (J.D. 1959), United States Attorney for the District of North Dakota (1981–1987), United States District Judge for the District of North Dakota (1987–2009) 
Edward J. Devitt - (LL.B 1935), U.S. Congressman (1947–1949) (R-MN), United States District Judge for the District of Minnesota (1954–1992) 
James R. Carrigan - (J.D. 1953), United States District Judge for the District of Colorado (1979–1995) 
H.F. Gierke III - (J.D. 1966), Judge, United States Court of Appeals for the Armed Forces (1991–present), elevated to Chief Judge in 2004
Gerald W. VandeWalle - (J.D. 1958),  Justice of the North Dakota Supreme Court (1978–present), elevated to Chief Justice in 1993. 
Daniel J. Crothers - (J.D. 1982), Justice of the North Dakota Supreme Court (2005–present) 
Mary Muehlen Maring - (J.D. 1975), Justice of the North Dakota Supreme Court (1996–2013) 
Dale V. Sandstrom - (J.D. 1975), North Dakota Public Service Commissioner (1983–1992), Justice of the North Dakota Supreme Court (1992–2015) 
Lisa K. Fair McEvers - (J.D. 1997), Justice of the North Dakota Supreme Court (2014–present) 
William Langer - (LL.B 1906), Attorney General of North Dakota (1919–1920), Governor of North Dakota (1933–1934, 1937–1939), U.S. Senator (R-ND) (1940–1959) 
John Moses - (LL.B. 1915), Governor of North Dakota (1939–1945), U.S. Senator (D-ND) (1945) 
Allen I. Olson - Governor of North Dakota (1981–1985) 
Rosanna M. Peterson - (J.D. 1991), United States District Judge for the Eastern District of Washington (2010–present) 
Charles Tighe - (1951), Lieutenant Governor of North Dakota (1965–1969)
Peter D. Welte - (J.D. 1997), United States District Judge for the District of North Dakota (2019–present)
Daniel M. Traynor - (J.D. 1997), United States District Judge for the District of North Dakota (2020–present)

Notes

External links
University of North Dakota School of Law website

Law schools in North Dakota
University of North Dakota
Buildings and structures in Grand Forks, North Dakota
1899 establishments in North Dakota
Educational institutions established in 1899